Liu Xi or Liuxi may refer to:

People
 Liu Zhong (died 193 BC), also known as Liu Xi, Han dynasty prince, elder brother of Emperor Gaozu
 Liu Xi (Han Zhao) (died 329), final leader of the state of Han Zhao (as crown prince)
 Liu Xi (Liao dynasty) ( 10th century), official of the Liao dynasty
 Liu Xi (Eastern Han prince) (劉歙; died 34), Eastern Han prince, relative of Emperor Guangwu
 Liu Xi (Eastern Han official) (劉憙), Eastern Han official

Places
Liuxi Township, Jiangxi (柳溪乡), township in Fengxin County, Jiangxi, China
Liuxi Township, Qu County (流溪乡), township in Qu County, Sichuan, China
Liuxi Township, Wangcang County (柳溪乡), township in Wangcang County, Sichuan, China